Tragedy of a Ridiculous Man is a 1981 Italian film directed by Bernardo Bertolucci. It stars Anouk Aimée and Ugo Tognazzi, who was awarded the Best Male Actor Award at the 1981 Cannes Film Festival for his performance. In his review, Vincent Canby describes the film as, "Bernardo Bertolucci's very good, cerebrally tantalizing new film, Tragedy of a Ridiculous Man, the story of what may or may not be a terrorist kidnapping of the sort that has been making Italian headlines with increasing frequency in recent years."

Plot
Primo Spaggiari is a small cheese factory worker from Parma. Primo is of peasant origin and did not go beyond elementary school, so he is considered as a self-made man. His wife Barbara, on the other hand, is a refined woman of French origin. One day, their son Giovanni is kidnapped by a group of terrorists and Primo has to raise a billion of lire for the ransom. Meanwhile, the dairy he owns is hit by a serious economic crisis.

A young worker, Laura, Giovanni's girlfriend, and a worker priest, Adelfo, who know a lot about the kidnapping, intervene in the story. From them, Primo learns that his son has died. Primo, however, continues to collect the money, helped in this by his wife, to save his second creature: the factory, on the verge of bankruptcy.

Following the indications of a false letter, written by Giovanni's girlfriend, the couple deposits the ransom money in the indicated place. The sudden reappearance of Giovanni means that in the end the billion is invested precisely in the dairy, transformed into a cooperative company, under the control of the workers.

Cast
 Ugo Tognazzi - Primo Spaggiari
 Anouk Aimée - Barbara Spaggiari
 Laura Morante - Laura
 Victor Cavallo - Adelfo
 Olimpia Carlisi - Romola, the palm reader
 Vittorio Caprioli - Marshal Angrisani
 Renato Salvatori - Colonel Macchi
 Ricky Tognazzi - Giovanni Spaggiari
 Gianni Migliavacca
 Margherita Chiari - Maid
 Ennio Ferrari
 Gaetano Ferrari - Guard
 Franco Trevisi
 Pietro Longari Ponzoni
 Don Backy - Crossing Keeper

References

External links
 

1981 films
1981 comedy films
1980s Italian-language films
Films directed by Bernardo Bertolucci
Commedia all'italiana
Films scored by Ennio Morricone
Films about child abduction
1982 comedy films
1982 films
1980s Italian films